Raymond Edwin Wolfinger (29 June 1931 – 6 February 2015) was an American political scientist and professor at the University of California at Berkeley. He was best known as the co-author (with Steven J. Rosenstone) of an influential book on voter turnout, Who Votes. Prior to his tenure at Berkeley, he was on the faculty at Stanford University. In between this academic career he was an assistant to Sen. Hubert H. Humphrey, for whom he helped manage passage of the 1964 Civil Rights Act. Wolfinger was the source of the well-known aphorism, “The plural of anecdote is data.”  He was a behavioral political scientist, an empiricist in search of better data and rigorous thinking and testing, and a protégé of Robert Dahl.

He received his Ph.D. in Political Science from Yale University, his M.A. from the University of Illinois, and his B.A. from the University of California, Berkeley.

References

External links
Links to scholarly articles
Links to the David B. Filvaroff and Raymond E. Wolfinger Civil Rights Acts Papers, 1961-1968

1931 births
2015 deaths
American political scientists
American political writers
Stanford University faculty
Fellows of the American Academy of Arts and Sciences
University of California, Berkeley faculty
Yale Graduate School of Arts and Sciences alumni
20th-century American non-fiction writers
21st-century American non-fiction writers
20th-century American male writers
American male non-fiction writers
21st-century American male writers